Robert Jackson (born 13 August 1960) is an Australian former professional rugby league footballer who played for the Penrith Panthers, Fulham, Warrington and the Cronulla Sharks.

Playing career

Early career
Born in Australia, Jackson grew up in Lalor Park, New South Wales. He started his rugby league career with Penrith Panthers, making 10 first grade appearances between 1982 and 1983.

In 1984, he moved to England, playing eight games for Fulham in the 1983–84 season.

Warrington
Jackson returned to England the following season, joining Warrington. He went on to make over 200 appearances in ten years at the club. He also returned to Australia during the 1986 NSWRL season, making eight appearances for Cronulla Sharks.

While at Warrington, Jackson won the 1985–86 Rugby League Premiership with the club, scoring a try in a 38–10 against Halifax, and also won the 1989–90 Lancashire Cup, scoring two tries in a man-of-the-match performance against Oldham.

Personal life
After retiring from the sport, Jackson returned to Australia.

In 2016, he was inducted into Warrington's Hall of Fame.

References

External links
 Statistics at wolvesplayers.thisiswarrington.co.uk

1960 births
Living people
Australian rugby league players
Australian expatriate sportspeople in England
Rugby league props
Rugby league second-rows
Penrith Panthers players
London Broncos players
Warrington Wolves players
Cronulla-Sutherland Sharks players